The 1930–31 British Home Championship was a football tournament played between the British Home Nations during the 1930–31 season. The trophy was shared between England and Scotland as at the time a win was only worth two points and a draw one. Thus, despite England's dominance of the opening matches, their defeat to Scotland in the final game gave the Scots a share in the victory even though it was the only game they won.

England began the tournament in commanding fashion, with heavy defeats of Ireland and Wales in their opening matches. Scotland by contrast struggled, only managing draws with both opponents and  coming close to being upset in both matches. Going into the final match, England were already assured of a winners position, and only needed to draw with Scotland to take the position unopposed. However this proved beyond them as the Scots ran out 2–0 winners in Glasgow. In the competition's final match, Wales and Ireland fought a furious battle for third place, with the Welsh just edging the victory 3–2.

Table

Results

References 

 British Home Championship 1919-20 to 1938-1939  - dates, results, tables and top scorers at RSSSF
 

1930–31 in English football
1930–31 in Scottish football
Brit
1931 in British sport
1930-31
1930–31 in Northern Ireland association football